Breidleria is a genus of mosses belonging to the family Hypnaceae.

The genus was first described by Loeske.

The species of this genus are found in Eurasia and Northern America.

Species:
 Breidleria pratensis (W.D.J.Koch ex Spruce) Loeske

The genus name of Breidleria is in honour of Johann Breidler (1828 - 1913), an Austrian architect and botanist (studying Bryology and Mckology), from Leoben.

The genus was circumscribed by Leopold Loeske in Stud. Morph. Laubm. (Loeske) on page 172 in 1910.

References

Hypnaceae
Moss genera